Lago de Oviedo, also known as Laguna de Oviedo, is a saltwater lake in Jaragua National Park, Pedernales Province, Dominican Republic.

Size
It is approximately 25 km2 in area, making it the second largest body of water in the Dominican Republic after Lake Enriquillo.

Geology
Although receiving freshwater from the Bahoruco Mountain Range, the lake is hypersaline due to sea water flowing into the lake through an underground system caused by a karstic depression. Salinity levels show seasonal changes due to precipitation, evaporation and the amount of freshwater input. One of the most notable aspects of the lake is the greenish aspect of its water, caused by limestone sediments being dragged into the lake by the underground water flow.

Ecology
Its unique flora and fauna are perhaps its most interesting feature; in mangroves, American flamingos, rhinoceros iguanas, and various species of endemic birds and several cays inside the lake can be found.

References 
https://web.archive.org/web/20090905015652/http://jmarcano.netfirms.com/suroeste/geografia/lagosw2.html
http://www.grupojaragua.org.do/pnj_english.html

Geography of Pedernales Province
Lakes of the Dominican Republic
Saline lakes of North America